The 2017–18 Wichita State Shockers men's basketball team represented Wichita State University in the 2017–18 NCAA Division I men's basketball season. They played their home games at Charles Koch Arena in Wichita, Kansas and are led by 11th-year head coach Gregg Marshall. The season marked the Shockers' first season as members of the American Athletic Conference. They finished the season 25–8, 14–4 in AAC play to finish a tie for second place. As the No. 2 seed in the AAC tournament, they defeated Temple in the quarterfinals before losing to Houston in the semifinals. They received an at-large bid to the NCAA tournament for the seventh season. As the No. 4 seed in the East region, they were upset in the first round by Marshall.

Previous season
The Shockers finished the 2016–17 season 31–5, 17–1 to finish in a tie for first place in MVC play. In the MVC tournament, they beat Bradley, Missouri State, and Illinois State to win the tournament championship. As a result, they earned the conference's automatic bid to the NCAA tournament. As the No. 10 seed in the South region (considered by everyone to be too high), they defeated No. 7 Dayton in the first round before losing to No. 2 Kentucky in the second round.

The season marked the Shockers' final season as a member of the Missouri Valley Conference as the school announced on April 7, 2017 that it would be joining the American Athletic Conference effective July 1, 2017.

Offseason

Returning players
It was expected that the Shockers would return all five starters and nearly all of their scholarship players from the prior season. The only two seniors on the prior season's roster, Zach Bush and John Robert Simon, were walk-ons. Two underclass players, rising junior Eric Hamilton and rising senior Daishon Smith, announced plans to transfer from Wichita State. Hamilton had been a little-used reserve; Smith had started at point guard at the beginning of the 2016–17 season, but lost his starting position to Landry Shamet and was seeing relatively little playing time by the end of the season.

Two other players, Markis McDuffie and Shaquille Morris, declared for the 2017 NBA draft, but neither hired an agent, allowing them to return to Wichita State if they withdrew from the draft within 10 days of the end of the mid-May NBA Draft Combine (specifically May 24). Both withdrew from the draft the day before the deadline.

Departures

2017 recruiting class

Source

Injuries
On July 21, 2017, point guard Landry Shamet, a potential All-American, suffered a stress fracture in his right foot and would need surgery. He was expected to miss 12–16 weeks to recover from the injury. Shamet was expected to be ready for the team's season opener on November 10, and that proved true, as he scored 17 points in only 17 minutes of action in the Shockers' 109–57 blowout of UMKC and, according to the Associated Press, "looked completely recovered".

Shortly before practices began on September 29, it was announced that Markis McDuffie would be sidelined with a stress fracture in his left foot. It was expected that he would miss a majority of the non-conference schedule, but would return some time in late December. McDuffie returned for the final non-conference game on December 22 game against Florida Gulf Coast.

Preseason
At the conference's annual media day, the Shockers were narrowly picked to finish second in the AAC, receiving five of the 12 first place votes. Landry Shamet was named to the preseason All-AAC first team.

Roster

Schedule and results

|-
!colspan=12 style=| Exhibition

|-
!colspan=12 style=| Non-Conference Regular season
|-

|-
!colspan=9 style=| AAC regular season

|-
!colspan=12 style=| AAC tournament

|-
!colspan=12 style=| NCAA tournament

Rankings

^Coaches Poll did not release a Week 2 poll at the same time AP did.
*AP does not release post-NCAA tournament rankings.

References

Wichita State Shockers men's basketball seasons
Wichita State
Wichita State
Shock
Shock